Eucalyptus burdettiana, commonly known as Burdett gum or Burdett's mallee, is a species of flowering plant in the family Myrtaceae and is endemic to Western Australia. It is a mallee or shrub with smooth bark, lance-shaped adult leaves, flower buds with an elongated horn-shaped  operculum, greenish-yellow flowers and cup-shaped or bell-shaped fruit.

Description
The individual buds are sessile.

Taxonomy and naming
Eucalyptus burdettiana was first formally described by William Blakely and Henry Steedman in 1939 and the description was published in Contributions from the New South Wales National Herbarium from specimens collected by Steedman on stony outcrops of Mount Barren near Hopetoun in 1938. The specific epithet (burdettiana) honours William Burdett (1871-1940) who was a friend of Henry Steedman.

Distribution and habitat
Burdett gum is found on quartzite ridges and rocky areas of the Barren Range in the Fitzgerald River National Park where it grows in sandy soils. The only remaining population is composed of 140 plants split into five sub-populations.

Conservation
This eucalypt is classified as "endangered" under the Australian Government Environment Protection and Biodiversity Conservation Act 1999 and as "Threatened Flora (Declared Rare Flora — Extant)" by the Department of Environment and Conservation (Western Australia). The main threat to the species is inappropriate fire regimes.

See also
List of Eucalyptus species

References

burdettiana
Endemic flora of Western Australia
Endangered flora of Australia
Myrtales of Australia
Eucalypts of Western Australia
Plants described in 1939
Taxa named by William Blakely